Co-Ed Fever is an American sitcom that aired on CBS in 1979. The series attempted to capitalize on the success of the motion picture National Lampoon's Animal House. It was the third of three "frat house" comedy series to air in early 1979 (the others were ABC's Delta House and NBC's Brothers and Sisters). After CBS aired the first episode of Co-Ed Fever as a "special preview" on February 4, 1979, the airing's low ratings and viewer complaints caused the network to cancel it before it ever aired in its planned Monday-night time slot.

Co-Ed Fever ranked number 32 on TV Guides 50 Worst Shows of All Time list.

Synopsis
The series is set in Brewster House, a dormitory on the campus of Baxter College, a formerly all-female college that has just started to admit male students. Co-Ed Fever stars Heather Thomas (as Sandi), Alexa Kenin (Maria a.k.a. "Mousie"), Cathryn O'Neil (Elizabeth), Tacey Phillips (Hope), and Jillian Kesner (Melba) as residents of Brewster House, who are joined by David Keith (Tucker Davis), Christopher S. Nelson (Doug), and Michael Pasternak (Gobo). Jane Rose plays the "spaced-out" housemother Mrs. Selby and Hamilton Camp plays the role of Mr. Peabody.

The episode "Pepperoni Passion" was aired as a "special preview" at 10:30 p.m. EST on February 4, 1979, immediately after the airing of the movie Rocky. However, Co-Ed Fever was canceled in the period between the airing and the scheduled premiere date of February 19, the result of low ratings, viewer complaints and censorship issues because of content (a problem that also affected its rival shows). CBS scheduled another new sitcom, Billy, in its time slot. Six episodes were completed, but only "Pepperoni Passion" was broadcast in the United States; however, all six were aired in Canada (on BCTV in Vancouver) in a late-afternoon weekend time slot. The Brewster House set was later reused as the girls' dormitory during the first season of The Facts of Life, which premiered during the summer of 1979.

Episodes

References

External links
 
 Sitcoms online listing for Co-Ed Fever, including pictures and cast list
 YouTube video showing series promo and first few minutes of pilot

1979 American television series debuts
1979 American television series endings
1970s American sitcoms
CBS original programming
1970s American college television series
English-language television shows
Television series canceled after one episode
Television series by Filmways
Television series by MGM Television